Wan Mohd Khalmizam bin Wan Abdul Aziz (born 21 August 1986 in Tanah Merah, Kelantan) is an athlete from Malaysia, who competes in archery.

2008 Summer Olympics
At the 2008 Summer Olympics in Beijing Khalmizam finished his ranking round with a total of 674 points, five points behind leader Juan René Serrano. This gave him the fifth seed for the final competition bracket in which he faced Alexandru Bodnar in the first round. The Romanian surprised Khalmizam with a 106 score while he only came to a total of 105 points and he was eliminated. Bodnar would lose in the following round against Juan Carlos Stevens.

Together with Cheng Chu Sian and Muhammad Marbawi he also took part in the team event. With the 674 score from the ranking round combined with the 660 of Cheng and the 659 of Marbawi Malaysia were in third position after the ranking round, which gave them a straight seed into the quarter finals. With 218-213 they were however eliminated by the Italian team that eventually won the silver medal.

References

External links
 Wan Mohd Khalmizam
 Profile at worldarchery
https://www.olympic.org/w-mohd-khalmizam-wan-ab-aziz

1986 births
Living people
Malaysian male archers
People from Kota Bharu
Archers at the 2008 Summer Olympics
Olympic archers of Malaysia
Malaysian people of Malay descent
People from Kelantan
Archers at the 2006 Asian Games
Archers at the 2010 Asian Games
Southeast Asian Games silver medalists for Malaysia
Southeast Asian Games medalists in archery
Competitors at the 2005 Southeast Asian Games
Asian Games competitors for Malaysia